Ed Pompa (born December 14, 1962) is an American professional stock car racing driver. He currently competes part-time in the ARCA Menards Series, driving various cars for Fast Track Racing.

Racing career

Early years

ARCA Menards Series 
Pompa would get his start in the ARCA Re/Max Series in 2006, driving a Pontiac for Andy Belmont Racing, finishing 25th.

From 2008 to the present, he has then made select starts for various cars for Fast Track Racing each season. In 2010, he would suffer his first retirement at New Jersey Motorsports Park due to handling issues.

In 2017, Pompa would run a Clemson Tigers scheme after the team won the 2017 championship, after asking Clemson president James P. Clements.

In 2018, Pompa would crash out of the first Pocono race that year on lap 57, making the race his first DNF at Pocono.

Personal life 
Pompa is a major supporter and has raced to raise money for Double "H" Ranch, a camp for children with life-threatening illnesses. In 2015, Double "H" Ranch reported that Pompa had raised about $140,000 for the camp.

Pompa has a son, who graduated in 2012 from Clemson University.

Motorsports career results

ARCA Menards Series 
(key) (Bold – Pole position awarded by qualifying time. Italics – Pole position earned by points standings or practice time. * – Most laps led.)

ARCA Menards Series East

References

External links 
Ed Pompa driver statistics at Racing-Reference

1962 births
Living people
ARCA Menards Series drivers
NASCAR drivers
Racing drivers from New York (state)